Francesco IV may refer to:

 Francesco IV Ordelaffi (1435–1466)
 Francesco IV Gonzaga, Duke of Mantua (1586–1612)
 Francesco IV d'Este (1779–1846)